Wise One may refer to:
"Wise One", a song by John Coltrane from his 1964 album Crescent
Wise One, a concept in the Wheel of Time